The University of N'Djamena (UNDT) is the leading institution of higher education in Chad. It was created in 1971 as the University of Chad, and was renamed "University of N'Djamena" in 1994.

See also 
 Euclid Consortium, the university's international joint extension

External links 
 https://web.archive.org/web/20060205105902/http://www.bc.edu/bc_org/avp/soe/cihe/inhea/profiles/Chad.htm
 http://www.euclidconsortium.org/university-of-ndjamena/ 

 
Educational institutions established in 1971
1971 establishments in Chad